Otroea cinerascens is a species of beetle in the family Cerambycidae. It was described by Pascoe in 1866.

Subspecies
 Otroea cinerascens cinerascens Pascoe, 1866
 Otroea cinerascens vitticollis Breuning, 1948

References

Desmiphorini
Beetles described in 1866